James William Strutt (8 January 1924 – 8 November 2008) was a Canadian architect. Practising between 1950 and 1999 and working primarily in the Ottawa area, Strutt is noted for his role in the development of modern architecture in Canada following World War II.

Biography

James William Strutt was born in Pembroke, Ontario, and grew up in Ottawa in the Glebe neighbourhood. He had one sister, Esther. After graduating from Ottawa Technical High School in 1942, he enlisted into the Royal Canadian Air Force, becoming a pilot. During the War Strutt served on Canada's east coast as part of RAF Coastal Command.

Following the War, through the Veterans Charter, Strutt enrolled at the University of Toronto to study mechanical engineering. After a single semester he transferred to architecture. During his time at the U of T he met both Buckminster Fuller and Frank Lloyd Wright. On 21 May 1949 at the Bishop Strachan School chapel, Strutt married Audrey Elizabeth Lett of Toronto (d. 2004), who was also attending the University of Toronto. The couple later had four children: Lesley, David, Katherine, and Jocelyn. James and Audrey both graduated in 1950.

Following his graduation, Strutt returned to Ottawa where he got a job with the firm Lefort and Gilleland. A year later, Strutt and William Gilleland broke off to form their own partnership, Strutt and Gilleland, which lasted until 1960. Throughout the 1950s the firm worked primarily on residential projects. Notable among them was Strutt's own 1956 house in Gatineau, which employed a hyperbolic paraboloid roof. At the house, the Strutts regularly threw parties which included prominent guests such as Pierre Trudeau. After falling into abeyance in the years following Strutt's death, in 2010 the National Capital Commission purchased the house and is in the process of restoring it to original condition. During the same period, Strutt and Gilleland also received two commissions as part of the Department of Transportation's post-war airport construction programme. The firm designed the Ottawa and Halifax terminals, both of which were done in the international style.

In 1960, with Inigo Adamson, Strutt formed the partnership Strutt and Adamson, which lasted until 1966. That year, Strutt formed a personal practice, J.W. Strutt, Architect, at which he would remain for the duration of his career.

With the Ontario Association of Architects Strutt served as the chairman of the Ottawa chapter (1955-1956), vice president (1958-1959), and president (1959-1960). With the Royal Architectural Institute of Canada he served as honorary treasurer (1963-1964), honorary secretary (1965-1966), and vice-president (1966-1967). Between 1969 and 1986 he taught at the department of architecture at Carleton University, serving as the department director from 1987 to 1988.

Following his death in 2008, a group of individuals began the Strutt Foundation. The foundation - a non-for-profit which was incorporated in 2013 - seeks to support projects relating to modern architecture in Canada. The foundation also has an archive which includes some papers of Strutt's, papers from Strutt's clients, and papers of various other Canadian modernist architects.

Strutt's records and held at Library and Archives Canada as the James W. Strutt fonds.

Works

References

1924 births
2008 deaths
Strutt
Modernist architecture in Canada
People from Pembroke, Ontario